FullBlackHabit is the fifth studio album by 16volt, released on June 19, 2007 by Metropolis Records. The album's title was directly inspired by the 1987 film FullMetalJacket. Early versions of the song "Suffering You" previously debuted on the soundtrack to the 2003 PlayStation 2 video game Primal and later appeared the band's greatest hits album in 2005.

Reception
Fabryka awarded the FullBlackHabit four out of four stars and said "Eric Powell reconned up with his music fascinations and ideas, to find a golden mean what finally led him to create an album with a variety of songs, modern and fresh but still recognized as a 16volt's venture." Kristofer Upjohn of Raves gave the album four our of five stars and said "the textures and rhythms are catchy and the melodic input is finely performed as well."

Track listing

Personnel
Adapted from the FullBlackHabit liner notes.

16volt
 Eric Powell – lead vocals, guitar, programming, keyboards, production, engineering, recording, mixing, cover art

Addition performers
 Jason Bazinet – additional percussion (1-3, 5-11, 13)
 Paul Raven – bass guitar (1, 2, 8, 10, 11)
 Scott Robison – additional arrangements (12)
 Bill Sarver (as Billdeaux) – additional programming (12)
 Kraig Tyler – bass guitar (4, 13), additional guitar (6, 12), guitars (4), additional bass guitar (12)
 Steve White (as Steve Pig) – additional guitars (1, 2, 9-11, 13)

Production and design
 Ryan Foster – mastering

Release history

References

External links 
 
 FullBlackHabit at Bandcamp
 

2007 albums
16volt albums
Metropolis Records albums